Victoria Sporting Club, commonly known as Victoria SC, is a football club based in Dhaka, Bangladesh. Founded in 1903, the club competes in the Dhaka Senior Division League, the third tier of football in Bangladesh. They were relegated from the Bangladesh Championship League, in 2021.

History
Victoria Sporting Club, commonly known as Victoria SC, is a football club based in Dhaka. 
It was established in 1903, and named after Queen Victoria during the British regime. It is one of the oldest clubs in Bangladesh (formerly East Pakistan), and in 1948 they made history by becoming the first ever winners of the Dhaka League. Aside from their historic triupmh, they emerged champions of the league during the 1962 and 1964 edition/season, while finishing runners-up in 1960 and 1961. The club also participated in the historic IFA Shield before the partition of Bengal.

In 1962, Victoria clinched the prestigious Aga Khan Gold Cup title, dismantling the fedder team for South Korea, Young Taegeuk Football Association 5–1. Many at the time considered Victoria SC to be the strongest club side in South Asia.

Head coach

Honours

Domestic
Dhaka League
Winner (3): 1948, 1962, 1964
Runners-up (1): 2010 
Dhaka First Division League
Winner (3): 1996, 1999, 2001
Aga Khan Gold Cup
Winner (1): 1962
Nar Narayan Shield
Winners (1): 1948

Invitational
Sikkim Governor's Gold Cup
Runners-up (1): 1993

Notable players
  Syed Abdus Samad (1927)
  Muhammad Umer (1961)
  Abdul Ghafoor Majna (1962–1964)
  Shabbir Ali (1984–1985)
  Raju Kaji Shakya (1986–1988)

Cricket section

See also
 List of football clubs in Bangladesh
 History of football in Bangladesh

Notes

References

Further reading

External links
Team info at Global Sports Archive
Team profile at Soccerway
Team profile at Sofascore

Football clubs in Bangladesh
1903 establishments in India
Sport in Dhaka
Bangladesh Championship League
Association football clubs established in 1903